Bucculatrix ruficoma is a moth in the  family Bucculatricidae. It is found in Uganda. It was described in 1931 by Edward Meyrick.

The larvae feed on Ipomoea batatas.

References

Natural History Museum Lepidoptera generic names catalog

Bucculatricidae
Moths described in 1931
Taxa named by Edward Meyrick
Moths of Africa